Skipá is the name of two rivers in the village of Sørvágur in the Faroe Islands. The name Skipá translates to 'ship river'. Both rivers run in proximity to the harbour in Sørvágur, and hence the name.

Rivers of the Faroe Islands